Bijaganita  was treatise on algebra by the Indian mathematician Bhāskara II. It is the second volume of his main work Siddhānta Shiromani ("Crown of treatises") alongside Lilāvati, Grahaganita and Golādhyāya.

Meaning 
Bijaganita, which literally translates to "mathematics using seeds", is one of the two main branches of mediaeval Indian mathematics, the other being , or "mathematics using algorithms. It derives its name from the fact that it employs algebraic equations that are compared to plant seeds due to their capacity to generate solutions to mathematical problems."

Contents 
The book is divided into six parts, mainly indeterminate equations, quadratic equations, simple equations, surds. The contents are:

 Introduction
 On Simple Equations
 On Quadratic Equations
 On Equations involving indeterminate Questions of the 1st Degree
 On Equations involving indeterminate Questions of the 2nd Degree
 On Equations involving Rectangles

In Bijaganita Bhāskara II refined Jayadeva's way of generalization of Brahmagupta's approach to solving indeterminate quadratic equations, including Pell's equation which is known as chakravala method or cyclic method. Bijaganita is the first text to recognize that a positive number has two square roots

Translations
The translations or editions of the Bijaganita into English include:
 1817. Henry Thomas Colebrooke, Algebra, with Arithmetic and mensuration, from the Sanscrit of Brahmegupta and Bháscara
 1813. Ata Allah ibn Ahmad Nadir Rashidi; Samuel Davis
 1813. Strachey, Edward, Sir, 1812–1901
  Bhaskaracharya's Bijaganita and its English and Marathi Translation by Prof. S. K. Abhyankar	

Two notable Scholars from Varanasi Sudhakar Dwivedi and  Bapudeva Sastri studied Bijaganita in the nineteenth century.

See also
 Indian mathematics
 Timeline of algebra and geometry

References

Bibliography

External links
Hindi translation by Durga Prasad

Indian mathematics
Social history of India
History of science and technology in India
History of algebra
12th-century books
Sanskrit texts